Harry Warner Farnall (18 December 1838 – 5 June 1891) was a New Zealand politician, emigration agent and labour reformer. He was a Member of Parliament from Auckland.

He was born in Burley Park, Hampshire, England, on 18 December 1838.

He represented the Northern Division electorate from 1869 to 1870, and then the Rodney electorate from 1871 to 1872, when he resigned.

Farnall contested the 1886 Waitemata by-election and was beaten by Richard Monk. Of seven candidates, he came last.

References

1838 births
1891 deaths
Members of the New Zealand House of Representatives
People from New Forest District
Unsuccessful candidates in the 1890 New Zealand general election
New Zealand MPs for North Island electorates
English emigrants to New Zealand
19th-century New Zealand politicians